Metarranthis refractaria, the refracted metarranthis, is a species of geometrid moth in the family Geometridae. It is found in North America.

The MONA or Hodges number for Metarranthis refractaria is 6827.

References

Further reading

 

Ennominae
Articles created by Qbugbot
Moths described in 1858